Cournot may refer to:

Cournot competition, an economic model of duopoly

Surname
 Antoine Augustin Cournot (1801–1877), French philosopher, mathematician and economist
 Michel Cournot (1922–2007), French journalist, screenwriter and film director